The 2015 São Tomé (Island or Regional) First Division took place that season.  The club was had 10 clubs and appeared in that number for the last time, the competition began in June and finished on 19 November. Geographically almost all clubs but Neves that took part in the Premier Division were in the east. Sporting Praia Cruz won the title and went on to participate in the national championships for the seventh time in November. Sporting Praia Cruz were first crowned as champions on October 26, a round before the season ended. A total of 90 matches were played and 231 goals were scored.

Overview
Agrosport, Trindade, Inter Bom Bom and Ké Morabeza (formerly Bela Vista) were in the top four of the Second Division with Agrosport winning the title.

Both Neves and Juba Diogo Simão were relegated into the Second Division in the following season as they were the last placed clubs. Neves did not return until 2017, Juba Diogo Simão did not return, in 2017, the club withdrew from the Third Division.

Folha Fede scored the most goals numbering 30, second was Sporting Praia Cruz and UDRA with 29, and fourth was 8th placed Correia  Juba Diogo Simão scored the least with only eight goals. On the opposites, Juba Diogo Simão conceded the most with 41, second was Neves with 30 and third was Aliança Nacional with 28.

Teams

Ten clubs participated in the 2014 season (third time since its reduction), Sporting Praia Cruz won their eight and recent title and went on to participate in the national championship match in November 15.

Teams

References

Football competitions in São Tomé and Príncipe
Sao Tome
Sao Tome First Division